Intimate Miniatures, Op. 20, is a four-movement suite for string quartet written in 1938 by the Swedish composer Lars-Erik Larsson. Originally, the pieces were part of a longer, six-movement "lyrical suite" ("") called Late Autumn Leaves, which Larsson had written to accompany a recitation of poems about fall by the Swedish writer Ola Hansson.

The Prim Quartet premiered Intimate Miniatures at the Fylkingen venue in Stockholm, Sweden, on 25 October 1940.

Structure

The movements of Late Autumn Leaves are as follows;  = Not included in Intimate Miniatures

The movements of Intimate Miniatures are as follows:

Note that Larsson reordered the movements.

Recordings
The sortable table below lists commercially available recordings of Intimate Miniatures:

Notes, references, and sources

  
  

Compositions by Lars-Erik Larsson
20th-century classical music
Classical music in Sweden
1938 compositions
Compositions for string quartet